Eupithecia redingtonia is a moth in the family Geometridae first described by James Halliday McDunnough in 1946. It is found in the US state of Arizona.

The forewings are smoky brown with a number of fine, oblique, wavy crosslines. The hindwings are dull smoky, deepening in color along the inner and outer margins. Adults have been recorded on wing in March and May.

References

Moths described in 1946
redingtonia
Moths of North America